Hroar Stjernen (born 11 February 1961) is a Norwegian former ski jumper representing Sprova IL and Trønderhopp.

Career
He won the silver medal in the team large hill event at the 1987 FIS Nordic World Ski Championships in Oberstdorf and finished fourth in the individual normal hill at those same championships.

Stjernen's lone individual World Cup victory came at Bischofshofen in 1985. He later worked as national team coach for the Norwegian ski jumpers between 1998 and 2002, but was criticized for poor results, resulting in his dismissal in January 2002. This dismissal would have no impact upon the team at the 2002 Winter Olympics in Salt Lake City, as the national team went home without a medal for the second straight time at the Olympics. He works today in Trønder-Avisa.

He is the father of ski jumper Andreas Stjernen. On 20 December 2011, Rosenborg BK announced that Hroar Stjernen will be their next Managing Director after Nils Skutle, starting 1 April 2012.

World Cup

Standings

Wins

References

External links 
 

1961 births
Living people
Norwegian male ski jumpers
FIS Nordic World Ski Championships medalists in ski jumping
20th-century Norwegian people